Zahrádky is a municipality and village in Česká Lípa District in the Liberec Region of the Czech Republic. It has about 700 inhabitants.

Administrative parts
Villages of Borek and Šváby are administrative parts of Zahrádky.

Notable people
Josef Neuwirth (1855–1934), Austrian art historian and architect

References

Villages in Česká Lípa District